"Nadine (Is It You?)" is a song written and recorded by Chuck Berry. It was released as a single in February 1964 and was the first music that Berry released after finishing a prison term in October 1963.

Composition

After his December 1959 arrest under the Mann Act, Berry eventually served a one-and-a-half-year prison term, from February 1962 to October 1963. He had not released a single since "Come On" in October 1961.

"Nadine" was recorded at a November 1963 session at the Chess studio in Chicago, his first after his release from prison. Another song from that session, "You Never Can Tell," would also be released as a single.

The composition resembles Berry's first hit, "Maybellene," similarly featuring lyrics about pursuing a girl, though in "Nadine" the pursuit is not by car but on foot and by taxi. As Berry told Melody Maker, "I took 'Maybellene' and from it got 'Nadine.'"

As William Ruhlmann of Allmusic writes, the lyrics are distinguished by an "unusual use of similes," such as: She moves around like a wayward summer breeze; Moving through the traffic like a mounted cavalier; and I was campaign shouting like a Southern diplomat.

Chart performance
The song was released in February 1964 as a single on Chess (catalogue #1883), backed with "O Rangutang". It peaked at #23 on the Billboard Hot 100, #7 on the R&B chart, and #27 on the UK Singles Chart.

Reception
According to Allmusic, the song had a "profound influence" on the songwriting of Bob Dylan: "One  need only listen to 'Nadine (Is It You?)', released in February 1964, and then to the 1965 Dylan album Bringing It All Back Home, with its surreal story-songs, to hear the similarities."

Cash Box described it as "a hard-driving, rhythmic pop -blues tear-jerker essayed with authority and feeling."

In the 1987 documentary film Hail! Hail! Rock 'n' Roll (in which Berry performs "Nadine"), Bruce Springsteen praised the song's lyrics. Springsteen singled out the lines, I saw her from the corner when she turned and doubled back / Started walking toward a coffee-colored Cadillac. "I've never seen a coffee-colored Cadillac, but I know exactly what one looks like," Springsteen says in the film.

Later versions
The song has been recorded by numerous artists including Steve Forbert John Hammond Jr., Waylon Jennings, Billy Boy Arnold, Dion, George Thorogood, New Riders of the Purple Sage,  Juicy Lucy, Dire Straits, George Benson, Michael Nesmith, Motörhead, Dicky Lee, Stan Ridgway, and The Seldom Scene.

References

Chuck Berry songs
1964 singles
1964 songs
Chess Records singles
Songs written by Chuck Berry